Carrie Ward may refer to:
 Carrie Clark Ward, American actress
 Carrie Halsell Ward, Oregon State University's first African-American graduate